The Battle for the Ol' School Bell was an rivalry between the Troy State Trojans (now the Troy Trojans) and the Jacksonville State Gamecocks when the two schools started playing together in Division II. The series continued as the Trojans moved to the FCS, with the Gamecocks moving to the FCS soon after. The series came to a halt when Troy moved to what is now the FBS. However, with Jacksonville State moving to the FBS and Conference USA in 2023, the rivalry may be renewed again in the near future. The idea for a school bell trophy stemmed from the two schools' common origins as teachers' colleges.

History
The two teams first met in 1924 in Jacksonville, Alabama.  The last game was played in 2001. Jacksonville State leads the series 32–29–2.  Troy has won the last seven games of the series, while also going 12–3 since 1983 against the Gamecocks.

Game results

See also  
 List of NCAA college football rivalry games

References

College football rivalries in the United States
Jacksonville State Gamecocks football
Troy Trojans football
1924 establishments in Alabama